Sir George Henry Martin  (3 January 1926 – 8 March 2016) was an English record producer, arranger, composer, conductor, and musician. He was commonly referred to as the "Fifth Beatle" because of his extensive involvement in each of the Beatles' original albums. AllMusic has described him as the "world's most famous record producer". Martin's formal musical expertise and interest in novel recording practices complemented the Beatles' rudimentary musical education and relentless quest for new musical sounds to record. Most of the Beatles' orchestral arrangements and instrumentation were written or performed by Martin, and he played piano or keyboards on a number of their records. Martin's collaboration with the Beatles resulted in popular, highly acclaimed records with innovative sounds, such as the 1967 album Sgt. Pepper's Lonely Hearts Club Band—the first rock album to win a Grammy Award for Album of the Year.

Martin's career spanned more than six decades in music, film, television and live performance. Before working with the Beatles and other pop musicians, he produced comedy and novelty records in the 1950s and early 1960s as the head of EMI's Parlophone label, working with Peter Sellers, Spike Milligan and Bernard Cribbins, among others. His work with other Liverpool rock groups in the early–mid 1960s helped popularize the Merseybeat sound. In 1965, he left EMI and formed his own production company, Associated Independent Recording.

In his career, Martin produced 30 number-one hit singles in the United Kingdom and 23 number-one hits in the United States, and won six Grammy Awards. He also held a number of senior executive roles at media companies and contributed to a wide range of charitable causes, including his work for The Prince's Trust and the Caribbean island of Montserrat. In recognition of his services to the music industry and popular culture, he was made a Knight Bachelor in 1996.

Early years
Martin was born on 3 January 1926 in Highbury, London, to Henry ("Harry") and Bertha Beatrice (née Simpson) Martin. He had an older sister, Irene. In George's early years, the family lived modestly, first in Highbury and then Drayton Park. Harry worked as a craftsman carpenter in a small attic workshop, while Bertha cooked meals at a communal stove in their apartment building. At age 5, George contracted scarlet fever; Bertha, a nurse during the First World War, treated him at home. In 1931, the family moved to Aubert Park in Highbury, where the Martin family first lived with electricity.

When he was six, George's family acquired a piano that sparked his interest in music. At eight years of age, he persuaded his parents that he should take piano lessons, but those ended after only six lessons because of a disagreement between his mother and the teacher. Martin created his first piano composition, "The Spider's Dance" at age eight. George continued to learn piano on his own through his youth, building a working knowledge of music theory through his natural perfect pitch.

As a child, he attended several Roman Catholic schools, including Our Lady of Sion (Holloway), St Joseph's School (Highgate), and at St Ignatius' College (Stamford Hill), where he had won a scholarship. When World War II broke out, St Ignatius College students were evacuated to Welwyn Garden City. George's family left London, with him being enrolled at Bromley Grammar School. At Bromley, Martin led and played piano in a locally popular dance band, the Four Tune Tellers. He was influenced at this time by George Shearing and Meade Lux Lewis. He also took up acting in a troupe called the Quavers. With money earned from playing dances, Martin resumed formal piano lessons and learned musical notation. Martin endured the London Blitz during this time, inspiring an interest in aircraft.

Despite Martin's continued interest in music, and "fantasies about being the next Rachmaninoff", he did not initially choose music as a career. He worked briefly as a quantity surveyor, and later for the War Office as a Temporary Clerk (Grade Three), which meant filing paperwork and making tea.

In 1943, at the age of 17, Martin volunteered the Fleet Air Arm of the Royal Navy, having been inspired by their exploits in the Battle of Taranto in 1940. He trained at HMS St Vincent in Gosport. The war ended before Martin was involved in any combat, and he left the service in January 1947. During the war, Martin travelled to New York and saw performances by Cab Calloway and Gene Krupa. He also did nine months of aerial training in Trinidad, becoming a petty officer and aerial observer. On 26 July 1945, shortly after receiving his officer commission, Martin appeared on BBC radio for the first time during a Royal Navy variety show; Martin played a self-composed piano piece. As he climbed rank in the Navy, Martin consciously adopted the middle-class accent and gentlemanly social demeanor common for officers.

Encouraged by the pianist, teacher and broadcaster Sidney Harrison, Martin used his veteran's grant to attend the Guildhall School of Music and Drama from 1947 to 1950. He studied piano as his main instrument and oboe as his secondary, being interested in the music of Rachmaninoff and Ravel and Cole Porter. His oboe teacher was Margaret Eliot (the mother of Jane Asher, who later became involved with Paul McCartney). After that, Martin explained that he had just picked it up by himself. Martin also took courses at Guildhall in music composition and orchestration. After graduating, Martin worked for the BBC's classical music department, also earning money as an oboe player in local bands.

Parlophone 

Martin joined EMI in November 1950 as an assistant to Oscar Preuss, who had served as head of EMI's Parlophone label since 1923. Although having been regarded by EMI as a vital German imprint in the past, it was then not taken seriously and only used for EMI's insignificant acts. Among Martin's early duties was managing Parlophone's classical records catalogue, including Baroque ensemble sessions with Karl Haas; Martin, Haas, and Peter Ustinov soon founded the London Baroque Society together. He also developed a friendship and working relationship with composer Sidney Torch and signed Ron Goodwin to a recording contract. In 1953, Martin produced Goodwin's first record, an instrumental cover of Charlie Chaplin's theme from Limelight, which made it to no. 3 on the British charts.

Despite these early breakthroughs, Martin resented EMI's preference in the early 1950s for short-playing 78 rpm records instead of the new longer-playing  and 45 rpm formats coming into fashion on other labels. He also proved uncomfortable as a song plugger when occasionally assigned the task by Preuss, comparing himself to a "sheep among wolves".

Head of Parlophone 
Preuss retired as head of Parlophone in April 1955, leaving the 29-year-old Martin to take over the label. Martin soon hired Ron Richards to be his A&R assistant. However, Martin had to fight to retain the label, as by late 1956 EMI managers considered moving Parlophone's successful artists to Columbia Records or His Master's Voice (HMV), with Martin possibly to take a junior A&R role at HMV under Wally Ridley. Martin staved off corporate pressure with successes in comedy records, such as a 1957 recording of the two-man show featuring Michael Flanders and Donald Swann, At the Drop of a Hat. His work transformed the profile of Parlophone from a "sad little company" to a highly profitable business over time.

Early music records 
As head of Parlophone, Martin recorded classical and Baroque music, original cast recordings, jazz, and regional music from around Britain and Ireland. He signed singer Dick James, later the music publisher for the Beatles and Elton John, to a recording contract, and reached no. 14 with James's theme from The Adventures of Robin Hood.

Martin became the first British A&R man to capitalize on the 1956 skiffle boom when he signed the Vipers Skiffle Group after seeing them in London's 2i's Coffee Bar. They reached no. 10 on the UK Singles Chart in 1957 with "Don't You Rock Me Daddy-O", though their success faded with the end of the skiffle boom. In 1957, Martin signed Jim Dale, hoping the singer would prove Parlophone's answer to British rock and roll star Tommy Steele. Dale achieved success as a teen idol, reaching no. 2 on the chart with "Be My Girl". After recording an album, Jim!, in 1958, Dale cut his music career short to pursue his original profession as a comedian, frustrating Martin.

Martin courted controversy in summer 1960, when he produced a cover of the teen novelty song "Itsy Bitsy Teenie Weenie Yellow Polkadot Bikini" and released it mere days after the release of the record in the UK, opening him to public accusations of piracy. Martin's version, recorded by 18-year-old Paul Hanford, failed to chart in Britain—though it performed well in several other countries and reached no. 1 in Mexico.

Martin produced two singles for Paul Gadd in 1961. Later better known as Gary Glitter, at this time Gadd used the name “Paul Raven". Neither single was commercially successful. 

Martin's first British no. 1 came in May 1961, with the Temperance Seven's "You're Driving Me Crazy". Also that year, Martin produced Humphrey Lyttelton's version of "Saturday Jump", which became the theme tune of the influential BBC Radio programme, Saturday Club, and scored a success at no. 14 in the charts with Charlie Drake's novelty record, "My Boomerang Won't Come Back".

In early 1962, Martin collaborated with Maddalena Fagandini, then working at the BBC Radiophonic Workshop, to create two electronic singles, "Time Beat" and "Waltz in Orbit", which were released as records by the pseudonymous Ray Cathode. Martin also earned praise from EMI chairman Sir Joseph Lockwood for his top-10 1962 hit with Bernard Cribbins, "The Hole in the Ground". He earned another top-10 hit with Cribbins that year, with "Right Said Fred". Though Martin wanted to add rock and roll to Parlophone's repertoire, he struggled to find a "fireproof" hit-making pop artist or group.

In August 1964, Martin oversaw Judy Garland's final studio recording session, with two songs from the Maggie May musical.

Liverpool pop and rock acts 
By late 1962, Martin had established a strong working relationship with Brian Epstein, the Beatles' manager. Epstein also managed (or was considering managing) a number of other Liverpool music acts, and soon these acts began recording with Martin. When Martin visited Liverpool in December 1962, Epstein showed him successful local acts like Gerry and the Pacemakers and the Fourmost; Martin urged Epstein to audition them for EMI. Gerry and the Pacemakers scored their first no. 1 with their version of "How Do You Do It?", a song previously rejected by the Beatles, in April 1963. The group's next two singles (also produced by Martin), "I Like It" and "You'll Never Walk Alone", also reached no. 1, earning the group the distinction of being the first British act to have their first three singles top the charts.

Martin also produced the Epstein-managed Billy J. Kramer and the Dakotas, whose first single was a cover of the Beatles' "Do You Want to Know a Secret", which hit no. 2 on the chart. Kramer and Martin scored two UK no. 1's in 1963 and 1964—"Bad To Me" (also Lennon–McCartney original) and "Little Children". Kramer also reached no. 4 with another Lennon–McCartney song in 1964, "I'll Keep You Satisfied".

Martin began work with the Fourmost in summer 1963 with a cover of one of John Lennon's earliest songs, "Hello Little Girl", that reached no. 9. Their follow-up, released in November, was another Lennon–McCartney work, "I'm In Love", which reached the top 20.

Martin also agreed to sign the Beatles' Cavern Club associate Cilla Black. Her first record was a discarded Lennon–McCartney song, "Love of the Loved". The record was only a minor hit, reaching no. 35. Martin and Black rebounded in 1964 with two no. 1 hits, "Anyone Who Had a Heart" and "You're My World". Black's "Anyone Who Had a Heart" was the top-selling British single by a female artist in the 1960s.

Between the Beatles, Gerry and the Pacemakers, and Billy J. Kramer and the Dakotas, Martin-produced and Epstein-managed acts were responsible for 37 weeks of no. 1 singles in 1963, finally transforming Parlophone into the leading EMI label.

In December 1964, Gerry and the Pacemakers released "Ferry Cross the Mersey", a teaser for the February 1965 film of the same name in the style of the Beatles' A Hard Day's Night. The soundtrack album featured music by Gerry and the Pacemakers, the Fourmost, Cilla Black, and George Martin-orchestrated instrumental music.

Comedy records 
Martin produced numerous comedy and novelty records. His first success in the genre was the 1953 "Mock Mozart" single, performed by Peter Ustinov with Antony Hopkins – a record reluctantly released in 1952 by EMI, only after Preuss's insistence. In 1956 he produced the well known children's song "Nellie the Elephant" which was released by Parlophone in October of that year. In 1955, Martin worked with BBC radio comedy stars the Goons on a parody version of "Unchained Melody", but the song's publishers objected to the recording and blocked it from release. The Goons subsequently left Parlophone for Decca, but member Peter Sellers achieved a UK hit with Martin in 1957, "Any Old Iron".  Recognising that Sellers was capable of "a daydreaming form of humour which could be amusing and seductive without requiring the trigger of a live audience", Martin pitched a full album to EMI. The resultant album, The Best of Sellers (1958), has been cited as "the first British comedy LP created in a recording studio". Both The Best of Sellers and its follow-up Songs for Swingin' Sellers (1959) were critical and commercial successes in the UK.

Martin later became firm friends with Spike Milligan, and was best man at Milligan's second wedding: "I loved The Goon Show, and issued an album of it on my label Parlophone, which is how I got to know Spike." The album was Bridge on the River Wye. It was a spoof of the film The Bridge on the River Kwai, being based on the 1957 Goon Show episode "An African Incident". It was intended to have the same name as the film, but shortly before its release, the film company threatened legal action if the name was used. Martin edited out the 'K' every time the word Kwai was spoken, with Bridge on the River Wye being the result. The River Wye is a river that runs through England and Wales. The album featured Milligan, Sellers, Jonathan Miller, and Peter Cook, playing various characters.

Martin scored a major success in 1961 with the Beyond the Fringe show cast album, which starred Peter Cook, Dudley Moore, Alan Bennett, and Jonathan Miller; the show catalyzed Britain's satire boom in the early 1960s. In early 1963, he produced the accompanying soundtrack album for David Frost's satirical BBC TV show That Was the Week That Was, recorded in front of a live audience.

Martin frequently used comedy records to experiment with recording techniques and motifs used later on musical records, such as recording magnetic tape at half-speed and then playing it back at normal speed. (Martin used this effect on several Beatles records, such as his sped-up piano solo on "In My Life".) In particular, Martin was curious to see how tape offered advantages over existing technologies favored by EMI: "It was still in its infancy, and a lot of people at the studio regarded tape with suspicion. But we gradually learnt all about it, and working with the likes of Sellers and Milligan was very useful, because, as it wasn't music, you could experiment. ... We made things out of tape loops, slowed things down, and banged on piano lids."

Rivalries and tensions at EMI

Salary and royalty disputes 
By the time he signed a three-year contract renewal in 1959, Martin sought—but failed—to obtain a royalty on Parlophone's record sales, a practice becoming common in the U.S.: "I reckoned that if I was going to devote my life to building up something which wasn't mine, I deserved some form of commission", he reflected. The issue continued to linger in his mind, and Martin claimed he "nearly didn't sign" his spring 1962 contract renewal over this issue—even threatening EMI managing director L. G. ("Len") Wood that he would walk away from his job. At the same time as the contract dispute, Martin took a work trip in late March 1962 to Blackpool with his secretary, Judy Lockhart-Smith. This trip led Wood to discover that Martin had been having an affair with Lockhart-Smith, which further irritated Wood. With their relationship strained, Wood exacted a measure of revenge by having Martin sign the Beatles to a record contract to appease interest from EMI's publishing arm, Ardmore & Beechwood.

Martin was also infuriated by EMI's refusal to give him a Christmas bonus at the end of 1963—a year in which he had produced seven no. 1 singles and dominated the albums chart—because his £3,000 salary disqualified him from receiving one. "I, naturally, had a chip on my shoulder", he admitted later. He also advocated that the Beatles' penny-per-record royalty rate be doubled; Len Wood agreed to this, but only if the Beatles signed a five-year contract renewal in exchange. When Martin countered that EMI should raise the royalty without conditions. Wood grudgingly acquiesced, but Martin believed that, "from that moment on, I was considered a traitor within EMI".

Rivalry with Norrie Paramor 
During Martin's tenure at Parlophone, he also maintained a rivalry with fellow A&R director Norrie Paramor, head of EMI's prominent Columbia Records label. Before Martin became one of Britain's most in-demand producers thanks to his work with the Beatles, he was envious that Paramor had produced highly successful pop acts, such as Cliff Richard. He admitted to looking with "something close to desperation" for similar success. Martin also believed that Paramor's habit of forcing Columbia artists to record his own songs as B-sides (thus giving Paramor, who used more than 30 pseudonyms in this practice, a royalty on the single) was unethical. In March 1962, Martin met with a young David Frost to share insider information on the shady business practices of A&R men such as Paramor; this scoop aired in an episode of London AR-TV's This Week public affairs programme in November, causing Paramor great embarrassment.

Conflict with Capitol Records 
In 1955, EMI purchased American recording company Capitol Records. Though this gave Capitol the right of first refusal to issue records in the US from EMI artists, in practice Capitol's head of international A&R, Dave Dexter Jr., chose to issue very few British records in America. Martin and his EMI A&R colleagues became irate at how few British records were issued by Capitol, and how little promotion was given for the ones that were issued. In December 1962, Martin complained to EMI managing director Len Wood that he "would not wish to recommend Capitol Records to any impresario who was thinking of launching a future British show in the States". Dexter passed on issuing the Beatles' first four singles in the US, driving Martin out of desperation to issue "She Loves You" on the small, independent Swan label.

Capitol finally agreed to release a Beatles single, "I Want to Hold Your Hand", only after Wood met Capitol president Alan Livingston in person in November 1963 with an order from EMI chairman Sir Joseph Lockwood to do so. Martin alleged that when he and the Beatles traveled to New York to make their American debut in February 1964, Livingston kept Martin away from the press to minimize EMI's role (and promote Capitol's) in the Beatles' success.

Martin and the Beatles resented Capitol's practice of issuing records often highly divergent from British record releases. These changes could include the album title, cover art, and songs included. In addition, Dexter frequently altered Martin's mixes of Beatles tracks by processing them through Capitol's Duophonic mock stereo system. Capitol's divergent treatment of Beatle albums did not cease until the band signed a new contract with EMI in January 1967 that forbade such alterations.

Separation from EMI and start of Associated Independent Recording 
After his repeated clashes over salary terms with EMI management, Martin informed them in June 1964 that he would not renew his contract in 1965. Though EMI managing director Len Wood attempted to persuade Martin to stay with the company, Martin continued to insist that he would not work for EMI without receiving a commission on record sales. Wood offered him a 3% commission minus "overhead costs", which would have translated to an £11,000 bonus for 1964—though, in doing so, Wood revealed to Martin that EMI had made £2.2 million in net profit off of Martin's records that year. "With that simple sentence, he cut straight through whatever vestige of an umbilical cord still bound me to EMI. ... I was flabbergasted", Martin observed. As Martin exited the company in August 1965, he recruited a number of other EMI staffers, including Norman Newell, Ron Richards, John Burgess, his wife, Judy, and Decca's Peter Sullivan. Artists associated with Martin's new production team included Adam Faith, Manfred Mann, Peter and Gordon, the Hollies, Tom Jones, and Engelbert Humperdinck.

Martin conceived of his new company as being modeled on the Associated London Scripts cooperative of comedy writers in 1950s and 1960s, offering equal shares in the company to his A&R colleagues and expecting them to pay studio costs proportionate to their earnings. He named it Associated Independent Recording (AIR). Short of startup capital and with many of AIR's associated acts still under contract to EMI, Martin negotiated a business arrangement with EMI that would give EMI the right of first refusal on any AIR production. In exchange, EMI would pay a 7% producer's royalty on any AIR record by an artist not signed to EMI, and a 2% royalty on records by artists who were signed. A special arrangement was made for Beatles records, wherein AIR was to receive 0.5% of UK retail sales and 5% of the pressing fees EMI generated from licensing records in the US.

Martin's departure from EMI and foundation of an independent production company was major news in the music press, with the NME calling it a "shock to the recording industry". Wood attempted to lure Martin back to EMI in 1969 with an offered salary of £25,000, but Martin rejected it. Martin and Wood's working relationship ruptured for good in 1973, with Martin vowing only to negotiate with EMI through legal representatives from then on.

The Beatles

Epstein approaches EMI
In November 1961, new Beatles manager Brian Epstein travelled to London to meet with record executives from EMI and Decca Records in the interest of obtaining a recording contract for his band. Epstein met with EMI's general marketing director Ron White, with whom he had a longstanding business relationship, and left a copy of the Beatles' German single with Tony Sheridan, "My Bonnie". White said he would play it for EMI's four A&R directors, including George Martin (though it later emerged that he neglected to do so, playing it only for two of them—Wally Ridley and Norman Newell). In mid December, White replied that EMI was not interested in signing the Beatles. By coincidence, Martin gave an interview that week in Disc magazine in which he explained that "beat groups" presented unique challenges for A&R directors, and that he sought a "distinct sound" when scouting them.

Martin claimed that he was contacted by Sid Colman of EMI music publisher Ardmore & Beechwood at the request of Epstein, though Colman's colleague Kim Bennett later disputed this. In any event, Martin arranged a meeting on 13 February 1962 with Epstein, who played for Martin the recording of the Beatles' failed January audition for Decca Records. Epstein recalled that Martin liked George Harrison's guitar playing and preferred Paul McCartney's singing voice to John Lennon's, though Martin himself recalled that he "wasn't knocked out at all" by the "lousy tape".

With Martin apparently uninterested, Ardmore & Beechwood's Colman and Bennett pressured EMI management to sign the Beatles in hopes of gaining the rights to Lennon–McCartney song publishing on Beatle records; Colman and Bennett even offered to pay for the expense of the Beatles' first EMI recordings. EMI managing director L. G. ("Len") Wood rejected this proposal. Separately, Martin's relationship with Wood became strained by spring 1962, as the two had strong disagreements over business matters and also Wood's disapproval of Martin's ongoing extramarital relationship with his secretary (and later wife), Judy. To appease Colman's interest in the Beatles, Wood directed Martin to sign the group.

Martin met with Epstein again on 9 May at EMI Studios in London, and informed him he would give the Beatles a standard recording contract with Parlophone, to record a minimum of six tracks in the first year. The royalty rate was to be one penny for each record sold on 85% of records, which was to be split among the four members and Epstein. They agreed to hold the Beatles' first recording date on 6 June 1962.

Early Beatles sessions, 1962
Though Martin later called the 6 June 1962 session at EMI's studio two an "audition", as he had never seen the band play before, the session was actually intended to record material for the first Beatles single. Ron Richards and his engineer Norman Smith recorded four songs—"Besame Mucho", "Love Me Do", "Ask Me Why", and "P.S. I Love You". Martin arrived during the recording of "Love Me Do"; between takes, he introduced himself to the Beatles and subtly changed the arrangement. The verdict was not promising, however, as Richards and Martin complained about Pete Best's drumming, and Martin thought their original songs were simply not good enough. In the control room, Martin asked the individual Beatles if there was anything they personally did not like, to which George Harrison replied, "I don't like your tie." That was the turning point, according to Smith, as John Lennon and Paul McCartney joined in with jokes and comic wordplay, that made Martin think that he should sign them to a contract for their wit alone. After deliberating for a time whether to make Lennon or McCartney the lead vocalist of the group, Martin decided he would let them retain their shared lead role: "Suddenly it hit me that I had to take them as they were, which was a new thing. I was being too conventional."

Though charmed by the Beatles' personalities, Martin was unimpressed with the musical repertoire from their first session. "I didn't think the Beatles had any song of any worth—they gave me no evidence whatsoever that they could write hit material", he claimed later. He arranged for the Beatles to record a cover of Mitch Murray's "How Do You Do It" at a 4 September session, with the Beatles now featuring Ringo Starr on drums. The Beatles also re-recorded "Love Me Do" and played an early version of "Please Please Me", which Martin thought was "dreary" and needed to be sped up. Though Martin was sure "How Do You Do It" could be a hit, the Beatles hated the song's style and Murray disliked the Beatles' recording of it. Additionally, Ardmore & Beechwood protested Martin's plan to issue an A-side that was not a Lennon–McCartney song. Martin then reluctantly decided to have "Love Me Do" issued as the A-side of the Beatles' first single and save "How Do You Do It" for another occasion. (In April 1963, Martin achieved a No. 1 hit with the song as recorded by Beatle contemporaries Gerry and the Pacemakers.)

Martin was dissatisfied with Starr's 4 September performance and resolved to use a session drummer for their next recording session. On 11 September 1962, the Beatles recorded "Love Me Do" for a third time with Andy White playing drums, as well as the B-side of their first single, "P.S. I Love You", and a sped-up version of "Please Please Me". Starr was asked to play tambourine and maracas, and although he complied, he was definitely "not pleased". Due to an EMI library error, a 4 September version with Starr playing drums was issued on the British single release; afterwards, the tape was destroyed, and the 11 September recording with Andy White on drums was used for all subsequent releases. (Martin later praised Starr's drumming, calling him "probably ... the finest rock drummer in the world today".)

Despite Martin's doubts about the song, "Love Me Do" steadily climbed in the British charts, peaking at number 17 in late November 1962. With his doubts about the Beatles' songwriting abilities now quashed, on 16 November Martin told the band they should re-record "Please Please Me" and make it their second single. He also suggested the Beatles record a full album (LP), a suggestion Beatles historian Mark Lewisohn called "genuinely mind-boggling", given how little exposure the Beatles had achieved so far. On 26 November, the Beatles attempted "Please Please Me" a third time. After the recording Martin looked over the mixing desk and said, "Gentlemen, you have just made your first number one record". Martin directed Epstein to find a good publisher, as he believed Ardmore & Beechwood had done nothing to promote "Love Me Do"; this led them to Dick James, a business acquaintance of Martin.

Martin considered recording the Beatles' first LP as a live album at their home venue in Liverpool, The Cavern Club, and promoted this idea in an NME interview in late November. However, Martin found the Cavern unsuitable for recording in a mid-December visit, and he decided to record the group in the studio instead.

Commercial breakout, 1963–1964

1963
As Martin had predicted, "Please Please Me" reached no. 1 on most of the British singles charts upon its release in January 1963. "From that moment, we simply never stood still", he reflected. For the Beatles' first LP, Martin had the group record 10 tracks to pair with the A- and B-sides of their first two singles—for 14 tracks in total. They accomplished this in one marathon recording session, on 11 February 1963, with the Beatles recording a mix of Lennon–McCartney originals and covers from their stage act. Nine days later, Martin overdubbed a piano part to the song "Misery" and a celesta on "Baby It's You". The resulting album, Please Please Me, became a huge success in the UK, reaching no. 1 on the charts in May and staying there for 30 consecutive weeks until replaced by the Beatles' second album, With the Beatles. Please Please Me was the first non-soundtrack album to spend more than one year consecutively inside the top ten of what became the Official UK Albums Chart (with 62 weeks).

At this early stage of their working relationship, Martin played a major role in refining and arranging the Beatles' self-written songs to make them commercially appealing: "I taught them the importance of the hook. You had to get people's attention in the first ten seconds, and so I would generally get hold of their song and 'top and tail' it—make a beginning and end. And also make sure it ran for about two-and-a-half minutes, so that it would fit DJs' programmes". "I would meet them in the studio to hear a new number. I would perch myself on a high stool and John and Paul would stand around me with their acoustic guitars and play and sing it. ... Then I would make suggestions to improve it and we'd try it again", he recalled. The Beatles' frenetic recording schedule continued on 5 March 1963, as they recorded "From Me to You", "Thank You Girl", and an early version of "One After 909". Martin altered the arrangement of "From Me to You", substituting the Beatles' idea for a guitar intro with a vocalized "da-da-da-da-da-dum-dum-da", backed by overdubbed harmonica. "From Me to You" reached no. 1 in the UK singles charts in early May, staying there for seven weeks.

The Beatles returned to EMI Studios on 1 July to record a new single, "She Loves You". Martin liked the song but was skeptical of its closing chord, a major sixth cluster, which he found cliché. The Beatles, now increasingly confident in their songwriting, pushed back. As Paul McCartney recalled, "We said 'It's such a great sound it doesn't matter; we've got to have it'". Martin and recording engineer Norman Smith changed the studio microphone arrangement for "She Loves You", giving the bass and drums a more prominent sound on the record. "She Loves You" was released in late August and instantly became a massive hit in the UK, signalling the beginning of national Beatlemania and becoming the best-selling UK single by any artist in the 1960s.

Sometime in 1963, Martin and Brian Epstein arranged a loose formula to record two Beatles albums and four singles per year. The Beatles began work on their second LP on 18 July. Like their debut album, this record reflected the repertoire of the Beatles' contemporary stage act—at this time a mix of Lennon–McCartney originals and American R&B hits, particularly from Motown. Additional album sessions followed on 30 July and into September–October. Martin played piano on several of the tracks, including "Money (That's What I Want)", "You Really Got a Hold On Me", and "Not a Second Time", and also played Hammond organ on "I Wanna Be Your Man". Martin was particularly impressed with the Lennon–McCartney tune "It Won't Be Long" and chose it to be the album opener. With the Beatles came out on 22 November 1963 and spent 21 weeks atop the albums chart.

Martin and the Beatles recorded their next single, "I Want to Hold Your Hand" on 17 October—their first recording session with four-track recording. Impressed with the song, Martin merely suggested adding handclaps and adding compression to Lennon's rhythm guitar sound to imitate the sound of an organ. The single's B-side, "This Boy", featured complex three-part harmonies by Lennon, McCartney, and Harrison that Martin arranged. "I Want to Hold Your Hand" became another huge seller, staying at no. 1 in the UK for five weeks—and, in January 1964, becoming the group's (and Martin's) first no. 1 in the US. The song became the US year-end no. 1 record of 1964.

1964
On 29 January 1964, Martin and Smith traveled to Paris, where the Beatles were performing a residency, to have them record German-language versions of "She Loves You" and "I Want to Hold Your Hand" for the West German market. The Beatles initially refused to record these versions, forcing Martin to barge into their hotel room and insist they come to the studio. They meekly complied, recording "Komm, gib mir deine Hand / Sie liebt dich". They also recorded what was to be their next no. 1 single, "Can't Buy Me Love", which was the British year-end no. 1. Martin tweaked the arrangement by having part of the chorus open the song as an intro, so "it grabbed people".

Martin traveled to New York with the Beatles on 7 February, as the band embarked on their first visit to America—including landmark performances on The Ed Sullivan Show. Martin and Capitol Records planned to record a live album of one of the Beatles' appearances at Carnegie Hall, but they were stymied by the American Federation of Musicians' refusal to allow Martin, a non-union member, to participate in the recording.

In late February, the band re-entered the studio and began recording the soundtrack album to the Beatles' upcoming untitled feature film. The film, album, and lead single were all titled "A Hard Day's Night". Martin and George Harrison played piano and guitar, respectively, at half-speed for the song's solo, which was then played back at normal speed on the record. In addition to producing the Beatles' original songs for the album—the first and only to exclusively feature Lennon–McCartney songs—Martin orchestrated several instrumental numbers for the film. The film was a success, and the album and single both reached no. 1 in the UK and US when all three were released in July. Martin received an Academy Award nomination for best film score.

When Ringo Starr fell ill with laryngitis just before the Beatles' 1964 world tour began in early June, Martin recruited session drummer Jimmie Nicol as a temporary replacement. Martin joined them for part of their August/September North American tour, recording their performance at the Hollywood Bowl. (Overwhelming crowd noise made the recording unsuitable for release until, in 1977, Martin spliced some of the performances with others from their 1965 visit to the Hollywood Bowl; this was issued as The Beatles at the Hollywood Bowl, which made no. 2 in the US and no. 1 in the UK.)

The Beatles began recording their next studio album, Beatles for Sale in August, though the sessions continued intermittently through late October and the record was released on 4 December. Martin observed that the Beatles were "war weary" during many of these sessions, and the album included six covers because Lennon and McCartney had not written enough songs to fill out the record. The album included a February 1965 US no. 1 single, "Eight Days a Week" (which was not released in the UK). These sessions also produced a December 1964 single, "I Feel Fine", that reached no. 1 in the UK and US and was among the first pop records to feature feedback. Beatles for Sale also featured new percussion sounds on several tracks, such as timpani and chocalho. Martin contributed piano on their cover of "Rock and Roll Music". Beatles for Sale was the first album for which the Beatles were present for mixing. The album reached no. 1 in the UK but was not released in the US.

Shift to studio experimentation, 1965–1966

1965
In mid-February 1965, Martin and the Beatles began five months of sessions to record the music for their second film, Help!. The Beatles adopted new studio techniques for these sessions, typically overdubbing vocals and other sounds onto a carefully laid rhythm track. The group by now had grown confident in the studio, and Martin encouraged them to explore new ideas for songs, such as an outro to "Ticket to Ride" that was at a faster tempo than the rest of song. ("Ticket to Ride" reached no. 1 in the US and UK upon release a single.) The band continued to experiment with unusual instruments, such as an alto flute solo for "You've Got to Hide Your Love Away" scored by Martin. Notably, it was Martin's idea to score a string quartet accompaniment for "Yesterday" against McCartney's initial reluctance. Martin played the song in the style of Bach to show McCartney the voicings that were available. "Yesterday" (not released in the UK) became a US no. 1 and one of the most covered songs of all time. Help! and its eponymous single topped the charts in both countries.

The group reconvened in October and November to record another album in time for the holiday shopping season. Rubber Soul continued the Beatles' experimentation with new sounds and contained several groundbreaking tracks. "Norwegian Wood (This Bird Has Flown)" featured George Harrison on sitar, making it one of the first Western pop records to feature Indian instrumentation. (Martin had previously recorded sitar on a 1959 Peter Sellers comedy record.) On "Think For Yourself", Paul McCartney used a Tone Bender fuzzbox to record a heavily distorted bass line—the first known use of a fuzz pedal on bass guitar. The shimmering electric guitar sound on "Nowhere Man" was achieved by repeatedly reprocessing the signal to increase the treble frequencies, beyond the EQ limits permitted for EMI engineers. Martin himself recorded a Baroque-style piano solo on John Lennon's "In My Life", recording the tape at half-speed and playing it back at normal speed so the piano sounded like a harpsichord. Though Martin didn't play a harpsichord on the record, "In My Life" inspired other record producers to begin incorporating the instrument in their arrangements of pop records. Martin also composed the notes of the guitar solo Harrison played on "Michelle", which won the 1967 Grammy Award for Song of the Year.

The Rubber Soul sessions also included the double A-sided single "Day Tripper"/"We Can Work It Out", released along with the album in early December 1965. This was Britain's first example of a double A-sided record. Both sides reached no. 1 in the UK, and "We Can Work It Out" topped the charts in the US. Rubber Soul also hit no. 1 in both countries. Rubber Soul received strong critical acclaim upon its release and proved highly influential among the Beatles' musical contemporaries, such as the Beach Boys. Martin sensed a shift in how the group was recording albums:
I think Rubber Soul was the first of the albums that presented a new Beatles to the world. Up to this point we had been making albums that were rather like a collection of their singles. And now, we really were beginning to think about albums as a bit of art in their own right. We were thinking about the album as an entity of its own, and Rubber Soul was the first one to emerge in this way.

In early November, Martin scored orchestral renditions of Beatles songs for the taping of the Granada Television special The Music of Lennon & McCartney, which aired on 16–17 December.

1966
In early January 1966, the Beatles and Martin gathered at CineTele Sound Studios in London to re-record vocal and instrumental tracks from the band's August 1965 concert performance at Shea Stadium. The resulting tracks were issued as the soundtrack to the TV documentary, The Beatles at Shea Stadium.

The Beatles re-entered EMI Studios in April 1966, with the group's exploration of recording at Stax Records' studio in Memphis—without Martin there to produce—having been scuttled by media leaks. The sessions of the Revolver album began with a highly experimental track, "Tomorrow Never Knows"—a John Lennon song inspired by Timothy Leary's book, The Psychedelic Experience. The song featured several innovations in pop recording, including the use of a tanpura drone loop throughout the song, a backwards guitar solo, sped-up tape loops to produce strange sound effects, and artificial double tracking (ADT) and a rotating Leslie speaker on Lennon's vocal. (Martin's joking technical description of ADT to Lennon coined the term "flanging" in music.) Martin worked closely with EMI engineers Geoff Emerick and Ken Townsend to achieve these radical effects. Martin added tack piano to the song.

Other Revolver tracks featured musical departures for the group, as well. For Paul McCartney's "Eleanor Rigby", Martin scored and conducted a strings-only accompaniment inspired by Bernard Herrmann's score for the Alfred Hitchcock thriller Psycho. Emerick placed the studio microphones unusually close to the instruments for this score. George Harrison's Hindustani-style "Love You To" included sitar, tabla, and tanpura played by Harrison and musicians from the Asian Music Circle. Lennon's "I'm Only Sleeping" was recorded at a fast tape speed and then slowed down to achieve a drowsy, dream-like sound. "Got to Get You Into My Life" became the first Beatles song recorded with a brass section (double-tracked), and "For No One" featured a French horn solo scored by Martin and played by Alan Civil. "Yellow Submarine" included nautical-themed sound effects from EMI's sound library, many of them from Martin's prior productions of comedy records. Martin added a honky-tonk piano solo on "Good Day Sunshine".

The first single produced during the Revolver sessions was "Paperback Writer"/"Rain". Inspired by the pronounced bass sound of contemporary American R&B records, this single featured McCartney's Rickenbacker 4001 bass more prominently than previous Beatle records. (This was achieved by surreptitiously flouting EMI's equipment rules by using a reverse-wired bass amplifier as a microphone.) "Paperback Writer" featured three-part harmonies arranged by Martin and mixed to have a fluttering echo sound. "Rain", meanwhile, contained a slowed-down rhythm track and a backwards outro. "Paperback Writer" reached no. 1 in the US and UK. "Eleanor Rigby" and "Yellow Submarine" were released along with the finished album as a double A-sided single, with both sides reaching the top of the charts in the UK.

Revolver was released in August to highly favourable critical reaction, particularly in the UK. The album received a nomination for the 1967 Grammy Award for Album of the Year. Retrospective criticism has recognized it as being among the finest pop albums ever made, with numerous critics listing it at no. 1 all-time.

Sgt. Pepper and Magical Mystery Tour, 1966–1967

"Strawberry Fields Forever" and "Penny Lane"
By the time the Beatles resumed recording on 24 November 1966, they had decided to discontinue touring and focus their creative energies on the recording studio. Martin reflected, "the time had come for experiment. The Beatles knew it, and I knew it." They began working on a John Lennon composition, "Strawberry Fields Forever", which began as a simple arrangement of guitar, drums, and Mellotron. They remade the song the next week in a new key and tempo and with added instrumentation, including piano and bass guitar. Between 6–15 December, they attempted yet another arrangement, this time with cellos and a brass section scored by Martin, a large percussion section, swarmandal, and overdubbed backwards cymbals. Lennon asked Martin to combine takes 7 and 26 of the song, even though they were recorded at different tempos and in different keys. Martin, Ken Townsend, and Geoff Emerick accomplished Lennon's unusual request by carefully speeding up take 7 and slowing down take 26 so they were nearly equal in key and tempo. Martin mixed the track to include a false ending.

Soon after, the band began work on Paul McCartney's "Penny Lane", which featured a piccolo trumpet solo that was requested by McCartney after hearing the instrument on a BBC broadcast. McCartney hummed the melody that he wanted, and Martin notated it for David Mason, the classically trained trumpeter. Martin also orchestrated a larger brass and woodwind score with trumpets, piccolo, flutes, oboe, and flugelhorn.

By January 1967, EMI and Capitol Records executives were restless for a new Beatles single. In mid-February, the group responded by issuing "Strawberry Fields Forever"/"Penny Lane" as a double A-side. The single drew critical praise for its musical and recording inventiveness, with "Penny Lane" reaching no. 1 in the US. However, both sides of the single reached no. 2 in the UK, becoming the first British Beatles single in four years not to top the charts. (The sides competed for radio airplay, hurting each side's chart performance.) Though the Beatles were not bothered by their failure to reach no. 1, Martin blamed himself for the incident and called it "the biggest mistake of my professional life".

Sgt. Pepper's Lonely Hearts Club Band
The Beatles' late 1966 sessions stretched into April 1967, forming what became Sgt. Pepper's Lonely Hearts Club Band—a record continuing the Beatles' and Martin's imaginative use of the studio to create new sounds on record. Martin was involved as arranger throughout the album, starting with an overdubbed clarinet section on "When I'm Sixty-Four", recorded in December 1966.

Martin scored the brass overdubs for the album's title track, as well as on "Good Morning Good Morning". It was Martin's idea to segue the chicken clucking sound at the end of "Good Morning Good Morning" into the guitar lick that opens the reprise of "Sgt. Pepper's Lonely Hearts Club Band". For "Within You Without You", Martin arranged a score that combined Indian and Western classical music. Martin used vari-speed editing to alter the recording speed of several of the album's vocal tracks, including "When I'm Sixty-Four", "Lovely Rita", and "Lucy in the Sky with Diamonds". He and Geoff Emerick superimposed crowd noise sound effects onto the title track and crossfaded the song into "With a Little Help from My Friends", mimicking a live performance.

Martin played instruments on several songs, including the piano on "Lovely Rita" and the harpsichord on "Fixing a Hole". He played numerous instruments in the recording of "Being for the Benefit of Mr. Kite!", including a foot-pumped harmonium, Lowrey organ, glockenspiel, and Mellotron. For the song's psychedelic circus-themed instrumental breaks, he had engineers cut tapes of numerous carnival-instrument recordings into tape fragments, then reassemble them at random.

The first Beatles song that Martin did not arrange was "She's Leaving Home", as he had a prior engagement to produce a Cilla Black session, so McCartney contacted arranger Mike Leander to do it. Martin called this "one of the biggest hurts of my life", but still produced the recording and conducted the orchestra himself.

Martin applied heavy tape echo to John Lennon's voice in "A Day in the Life". He worked with McCartney to implement the 24-bar orchestral climaxes in the middle and end of the song, produced by instructing a 45-piece orchestra to gradually play from their instruments' lowest note to their highest. The song's extended piano fadeout (on which Martin played harmonium) concluded with a dog's whistle and a sped-up tape of the Beatles speaking gibberish on the run-out groove. Music critics have hailed the song as among the Beatles' best work and a groundbreaking pop record.

Sgt. Pepper cost £25,000 to produce, far more than any previous Beatles record. During the album's recording, Martin periodically worried whether the album's avant-garde inventiveness would alienate the general public; such concerns were alleviated by previewing tracks to guests, such as Capitol Records president Alan Livingston, who was "speechless in admiration". When Sgt. Pepper was finally released in early June 1967, it received widespread acclaim from music critics, with a Times critic deeming it "a decisive moment in the history of Western civilisation". The album reached no. 1 in both the US and UK and became the best-selling album in the UK by any artist both in 1967 and for the entire 1960s. In 1968, it became the first rock album to win a Grammy Award for Album of the Year. Peppers accolades also raised Martin's public profile as a record producer.

"All You Need Is Love" broadcast
In May 1967, Beatles manager Brian Epstein agreed (without the Beatles' knowledge) to have the group record a song live on the world's first live global television broadcast, Our World, on 25 June. The band decided to record Lennon's "All You Need is Love" for the occasion, which they felt would promote a positive message to the world. Martin believed it was too risky to record the entire track on the live broadcast, so he had the Beatles record a backing track on 14 June at Olympic Studios—with the unusual arrangement of Lennon on harpsichord, McCartney on double bass, Harrison on violin, and Starr on drums, with Eddie Kramer as audio engineer. Five days later, at EMI Studios, Martin overdubbed a piano, while Lennon added vocals and a banjo part. The band also asked Martin to write an orchestral score for the song, starting with the beginning of "La Marseillaise". The score for the fade-out of the song included bits from Bach's Inventions and Sinfonias, "Greensleeves", and "In the Mood". On 23 June, Martin recorded an orchestral track. (Though "In the Mood" was not in copyright, Glenn Miller's arrangement of the song was; this forced EMI to subsequently pay a royalty to Miller's estate.)

Martin learned the day before the broadcast, during a rehearsal, that a TV camera would be live in the EMI Studio One control room to show Martin, Geoff Emerick, and Richard Lush operating the controls for the recording. Emerick recalled that Martin turned to the engineers and said, "You two had better smarten yourselves up! You're about to become international TV stars!" During the 25 June simulcast, the Beatles' segment started broadcasting 40 seconds early, startling Martin and Emerick and forcing them to quickly hide a Scotch whisky supply they were using to calm their nerves. Worse, the production truck lost contact with the studio cameramen just before the segment started; this forced Martin to verbally relay the producer's instructions to the camera crew live.

Despite these technical glitches, the Beatles, the orchestra, and the assembled crowd of Beatle friends recorded a seamless live take of "All You Need Is Love" to an audience in the hundreds of millions. After the broadcast, Lennon re-recorded part of his vocal and Starr added a tambourine overdub. The song was quickly released as a single with "Baby You're a Rich Man" as a B-side, reaching no. 1 in numerous countries, including the US and UK. "All You Need Is Love" was the first Beatles single on which Martin received a written credit as producer.

Magical Mystery Tour
Before Sgt Pepper was even released, the Beatles held several sessions in April–June 1967 to record additional songs for a yet-to-be-determined purpose. These included "Magical Mystery Tour", "Baby You're a Rich Man", "You Know My Name (Look Up the Number)", and two songs later included on Yellow Submarine. Martin and later described many of these sessions as lacking the strong creative focus the band had displayed in recording Sgt. Pepper. Martin, showing less interest in these sessions, came uncharacteristically unprepared for the "Magical Mystery Tour" trumpet overdub session on 3 May, forcing the session musicians to improvise a score for themselves.

After taking most of the summer off, the Beatles and Martin recorded "Your Mother Should Know" at Chappell Studios in London on 23 August. Four days later, Brian Epstein died of an accidental drug overdose, devastating the band and Martin. McCartney urged the group to focus on the Magical Mystery Tour film project, and they resumed recording with Lennon's "I Am the Walrus". For this song, which Martin initially disliked but grew to appreciate, he provided a quirky and original arrangement for brass, violins, cellos, and the Mike Sammes Singers vocal ensemble singing nonsense phrases. Martin, at Lennon's request, also fed a live BBC radio recording of William Shakespeare's King Lear into the mixing desk for the song's fadeout.

Magical Mystery Tour was released as an EP in the UK in December 1967 and an LP in the US in late November; it reached no. 2 and no. 1 on those charts, respectively. It was nominated for Grammy Album of the Year in 1969. McCartney's "Hello, Goodbye", which featured orchestral overdubs scored and supervised by Martin, was issued as a single and reached no. 1 in both the US and UK.

Yellow Submarine and the White Album, 1967–1968

Yellow Submarine soundtrack
In early 1967, Brian Epstein and media producer Al Brodax signed a contract to have the Beatles provide four original songs to support an animated feature film, Yellow Submarine. The Beatles were initially contemptuous of the project, planning to relegate only their weakest songs to the soundtrack. The first song recorded for the film was George Harrison's "Only a Northern Song", which was debuted during the Sgt. Pepper sessions but rejected for inclusion by the other band members and Martin. The second was "All Together Now", a children's sing-along recorded without Martin's involvement. The third was "It's All Too Much", also recorded without Martin in attendance. The final original song for the film, "Hey Bulldog", was not recorded until February 1968.

Martin composed the film's orchestral scores, which comprised the second half of the film soundtrack. Martin composed these pieces while the Beatles retreated to India during the spring of 1968. Martin claimed to take inspiration for the score from Maurice Ravel, "the musician I admire most".

The Yellow Submarine film debuted on 17 July 1968 and was favorably received by critics. However, Martin chose to re-record the album's score after the film's release, delaying the soundtrack's release until January 1969. Yellow Submarine reached no. 2 in the US and no. 3 in the UK. Martin and three of the Beatles received a 1970 Grammy nomination for Best Sound Track Album.

The Beatles ("White Album")
The Beatles gathered for a brief spate of sessions in February 1968 before their planned retreat to India with the Maharishi Mahesh Yogi. These sessions produced a no. 1 UK single, "Lady Madonna", backed by "The Inner Light". While in India, the band members composed a large number of songs; they recorded these songs as demos at George Harrison's Kinfauns home.

By the time of the White Album sessions in mid-1968, Martin found himself in competition with Apple Electronics's eccentric inventor, "Magic Alex", for the Beatles' interest in studio production. Other new personnel attending Beatles sessions were Lennon's girlfriend, Yoko Ono, and Martin's protégé, Chris Thomas. Engineer Geoff Emerick, frustrated by the Beatles' increasingly unpleasant demeanor at many of the sessions, quit partway through the album's recording. Additionally, the Beatles began recording lengthy, repetitive rehearsal tracks in the studio. With all these disruptions to the band's studio dynamic, Martin consciously stayed in the background of many sessions, reading stacks of newspapers in the control booth until his guidance or assistance was sought.

Parts of the White Album sessions required Martin and his engineers to attend to simultaneous recordings in different studios, such as an occasion when Lennon was working on the musique concrète "Revolution 9" in Studio Three, while McCartney recorded "Blackbird" in Studio Two. Though Lennon and Ono were responsible for most of the final mix on "Revolution 9", Martin and Emerick applied a STEED delay effect to the track. Martin scored a fiddle arrangement on Ringo Starr's first composition, "Don't Pass Me By". He also scored brass arrangements on "Revolution 1", "Honey Pie", "Savoy Truffle", and "Martha My Dear".

Martin played celesta on the album's closing track, "Good Night", and conducted its orchestral arrangement. He also played harmonium on Lennon's "Cry Baby Cry".

Martin recommended the Beatles choose the 14 best tracks from the sessions and issue a standard LP. The band overruled him, however, and chose to issue a double album. The sequencing and cross-fading of the album required a 24-hour session attended by Martin, Lennon, and McCartney. The album was released in late November to strong commercial and critical success, reaching no. 1 in the UK and US for eight and nine weeks, respectively.

The White Album sessions produced a no. 1 single, "Hey Jude", backed with "Revolution". Martin scored a 36-piece orchestra for "Hey Jude"'s extended coda.

Get Back/Let It Be and Abbey Road, 1969–1970

Get Back/Let It Be
In early January 1969, the Beatles gathered at Twickenham Film Studios to compose and record new material for a live album. The group sought a raw, unedited sound for the album, with Lennon telling Martin that he didn't want any "production shit". Filmmaker Michael Lindsay-Hogg directed a film crew to observe the Beatles' work sessions for use in a feature documentary film. The band's working relationships faltered during these sessions, with Harrison quitting the group for several days out of frustration. (Martin later admitted he had contributed to Harrison's status as a "second-class" Beatle.) Martin decided not to attend many of these tense, aimless sessions, leaving balance engineer Glyn Johns to act as de facto producer.

In mid-January, the Beatles relocated their work to the basement studio of Apple Records at 3 Savile Row, where their work ethic and mood improved. As Magic Alex had failed to deliver on a promised 72-track studio there, Martin called EMI to request two mobile four-track mixing desks and soundproofing equipment to enable a suitable recording environment. The band was soon joined by keyboard player Billy Preston, who attended the remaining sessions and contributed to the Beatles' new compositions. The Beatles and Preston performed on the roof of Apple Records on 30 January 1969, while Martin recorded the impromptu concert in the building's basement studio. This concert performance—the Beatles' last—produced recordings of five new tracks, including a new single, "Get Back". The next day, the band returned to the basement studio to record several more, including future singles "Let It Be" and "The Long and Winding Road".

In March 1969, the Beatles rejected a proposed mix by Johns for a Get Back LP, scuttling hopes for a public release in the near term. The next month, they released "Get Back" as a single—though without a producer credit, as EMI was unable to determine whether Martin or Johns deserved the credit. "Get Back" reached no. 1 in the UK and US. In May, Martin and Johns worked together on another mix of Get Back—which the Beatles also rejected. Martin began at this time to consider that the Beatles might be finished as a commercial act. The Beatles rejected yet another Glyn Johns mix of the album in January 1970. Martin supervised the final Beatles recording session (without Lennon) on 3 January 1970, when the group recorded "I Me Mine". In early March 1970, "Let It Be" was released and reached no. 1 in the US (and no. 2 in the UK).

In late March and early April 1970, Phil Spector remixed the album—now known as Let It Be—and added a series of orchestral and choral overdubs to several tracks. Martin (along with McCartney) was critical of these embellishments, calling them "so uncharacteristic of the clean sounds the Beatles had always used". The album was finally released in May 1970, after McCartney had publicly announced he was leaving the Beatles. When EMI informed Martin that he would not get a production credit because Spector produced the final version, Martin commented, "I produced the original, and what you should do is have a credit saying 'Produced by George Martin, over-produced by Phil Spector'."

Abbey Road
The first song for what became the Abbey Road album, "I Want You (She's So Heavy)", was recorded on 22 February 1969 at Trident Studios without Martin. However, the Beatles did not inform Martin they planned to record a new album until later in the spring, when McCartney asked if Martin would produce it for them. "Only if you let me produce it the way we used to", he replied; McCartney agreed. Lennon and McCartney also persuaded Geoff Emerick to rejoin their sessions as balance engineer, beginning with a recording of the single "The Ballad of John and Yoko" in mid-April; the single, backed with "Old Brown Shoe", reached no. 1 in the UK after its 30 May release.

Martin's first album session came on 5 May, when he supervised overdubs to Harrison's "Something". Martin soon set to help the Beatles develop the second side of the album into a "medley" of songs, akin to a rock opera. Martin guided the band using his knowledge of classical music to conceive a fluid, cohesive series of songs with repeating themes and motifs. Sessions recommenced in July and continued into August. Martin played an electric harpsichord accompaniment to "Because". He also composed and orchestrated orchestral arrangements for four of the album's songs.

Abbey Road was released on 26 September 1969, topping the charts in both the US and Britain. The following year, Martin was nominated as its producer for Grammy Award for Album of the Year. Martin took particular pride in the symphonic medley on side two, claiming later, "There's far more of me on Abbey Road than on any of their other albums". The album's double A-sided single, "Something"/"Come Together", reached no. 1 in the US.

Post-breakup Beatles work

Beatle solo records

Martin produced the first solo album by a member of the Beatles after John Lennon had privately announced he was leaving the group—Ringo Starr's March 1970 standards album, Sentimental Journey.

Martin next worked with Paul McCartney to score orchestral arrangements on four songs for the 1971 album Ram. Martin then paired with McCartney and his band, Wings to produce the "Live and Let Die" theme song for the 1973 James Bond film of the same name. Martin arranged the orchestral production for the song, which reached no. 2 in the US singles chart. Martin's work on the song earned him the Grammy Award for Best Arrangement Accompanying Vocalist(s) at the 16th Annual Grammy Awards in 1974.

Martin and McCartney reunited in late 1980 to record "We All Stand Together", a song for a Rupert Bear animated short film, Rupert and the Frog Song. The song was released as a single in 1984, reaching no. 3 in the UK chart. The late 1980 sessions continued into the end of 1981 in AIR's studios in Montserrat and London, producing what became McCartney's 1982 Tug of War. Ringo Starr contributed drums to the top-10 US single "Take It Away". Tug of War was met with critical acclaim and topped both the US and UK album charts; the album's most successful single was "Ebony and Ivory", a McCartney duet with Stevie Wonder that also reached no. 1 in the UK and US. Tug of War and two of its tracks were nominated for a total of five Grammys.

McCartney and Martin used leftover material from Tug of War to start a new album, Pipes of Peace, which was released in 1983. The lead single, "Say Say Say", was a duet between McCartney and Michael Jackson that reached no. 1 in the US and no. 2 in the UK. Martin scored a horn arrangement for the song. The album's second single, the title track, reached no. 1 in the UK. Pipes of Peace did not receive the high acclaim of Tug of War, though it reached no. 4 on the UK album charts.

Martin produced the soundtrack album to McCartney's 1984 film, Give My Regards to Broad Street. Though the film was poorly received, the soundtrack reached no. 1 in the UK and was supported by a UK no. 2 single, "No More Lonely Nights". The soundtrack also featured numerous reinterpretations of McCartney Beatles classics.

Martin mixed McCartney's 1987 no. 10 UK single, "Once Upon a Long Ago". He recorded orchestral overdubs for McCartney's 1990 "Put It There" and 1993 "C'Mon People" singles. He provided additional orchestration on several tracks on McCartney's 1997 album, Flaming Pie, and co-produced the song "Calico Skies".

In 1998, at Yoko Ono's request, Martin scored an orchestral arrangement to the 1980 John Lennon demo of "Grow Old with Me", which appeared in the John Lennon Anthology. Martin's son, Giles, played bass.

The Beatles Anthology
Martin oversaw post-production on The Beatles Anthology (which was originally entitled The Long and Winding Road) in 1994 and 1995, working again with Geoff Emerick. Martin decided to use an old 8-track analogue mixing console – which EMI learned an engineer still had – to mix the songs for the project, instead of a modern digital console. He explained this by saying that the old console created a completely different sound, which a new console could not accurately reproduce. He said he found the whole project a strange experience, as they had to listen to themselves chatting in the studio, 25–30 years previously. Martin also contributed extensive interviews to the Anthology documentary series. All three of the Anthology double-album releases reached no. 1 in the US.

Martin was not involved in producing the two new singles reuniting McCartney, Harrison, and Starr, who wanted to overdub two old Lennon demos provided by Yoko Ono—"Free as a Bird" and "Real Love". Though Martin's hearing loss was cited publicly as the rationale, he was not asked by the band members to produce the tracks; Jeff Lynne performed these duties instead.

Cirque du Soleil and Love
In 2006, Martin and his son, Giles Martin, remixed 80 minutes of Beatles music for the Las Vegas stage performance Love, a joint venture between Cirque du Soleil and the Beatles' Apple Corps Ltd. A soundtrack album from the show was released that same year. As part of his contribution to the soundtrack album, Martin orchestrated a score for a demo version of "While My Guitar Gently Weeps"; the orchestra session, recorded at AIR Lyndhurst Hall, was his final orchestral production. Love reached no. 3 in the UK charts and no. 4 in the US. Martin received the 2008 Grammy Awards for Best Compilation Soundtrack Album and Best Surround Sound Album.

"Fifth Beatle" status
Martin's contribution to the Beatles' work received regular critical acclaim, and led to him being described as the "fifth Beatle". In 2016, McCartney wrote that "If anyone earned the title of the fifth Beatle it was George". According to Alan Parsons, he had "great ears" and "rightfully earned the title of "fifth Beatle". Julian Lennon called Martin "the fifth Beatle, without question".

In the immediate aftermath of the Beatles' break-up, a time when he made many angry utterances, John Lennon trivialised Martin's importance to the Beatles' music. In his 1970 interview with Jann Wenner, Lennon said, "[Dick James] is another one of those people, who think they made us. They didn't. I'd like to hear Dick James' music and I'd like to hear George Martin's music, please, just play me some." Martin rebutted Lennon's comments in an interview in Melody Maker. In a 1971 letter to Paul McCartney, Lennon wrote, "When people ask me questions about 'What did George Martin really do for you?,' I have only one answer, 'What does he do now?' I noticed you had no answer for that! It's not a putdown, it's the truth." Lennon wrote that Martin took too much credit for the Beatles' music. Commenting specifically on "Revolution 9", Lennon said, "For Martin to state that he was 'painting a sound picture' is pure hallucination. Ask any of the other people involved. The final editing Yoko and I did alone."

In contrast, in 1971 Lennon said, "George Martin made us what we were in the studio. He helped us develop a language to talk to other musicians."

Other artists

Independent production work, 1965–1980s
Martin's early work under his new Associated Independent Recording (AIR) banner included Cilla Black's rendition of Burt Bacharach's "Alfie", which made no. 6 in the UK, and musical scores for Lionel Bart's much-maligned Twang!! theatrical production. Another early AIR act was the Action, whom Martin had produced earlier through Parlophone. AIR's first official outside signing was David and Jonathan, who scored a no. 7 UK hit with "Lovers of the World Unite" in 1966. Martin also reunited with other artists from his Parlophone days, such as Matt Monro, Rolf Harris, and Ron Goodwin, though these reunions often failed to produce the same success as earlier records had.

Martin also continued to produce novelty music acts, such as the Scaffold, the comedy rock group featuring Paul McCartney's brother, Mike McGear. In November 1967, they released their first top-10 hit, "Thank U Very Much"—though it was also the last Scaffold record produced by Martin. Martin also recorded the Master Singers, whose "Highway Code" single became a minor hit in April 1966.

In October 1970, Martin and his AIR partners opened their first company studio at the top of the Peter Robinson building in Oxford Circus, London.

Additional artists that Martin worked with include singers Celine Dion, Kenny Rogers, Yoshiki of X Japan, Gary Brooker, Neil Sedaka, and the a cappella vocal ensemble the King's Singers; guitarists Jeff Beck, John McLaughlin, and John Williams; 1960s duo Edwards Hand; and the bands Seatrain, Ultravox, UFO, Cheap Trick, and Little River Band. Martin produced four albums for America, which included the hits "Tin Man," "Lonely People," and "Sister Golden Hair." As the band's Gerry Beckley said in a 2017 interview, "He was really great at keeping us focused and moving forward."

He also produced the album The Man in the Bowler Hat (1974) for the eccentric British folk-rock group Stackridge. Martin worked with Paul Winter on his (1972) Icarus album, which was recorded in a rented house by the sea in Marblehead, Massachusetts. Winter said that Martin taught him "how to use the studio as a tool", and allowed him to record the album in a relaxed atmosphere, which was different from the pressurised control in a professional studio. In 1979 he worked with Ron Goodwin to produce the album containing The Beatles Concerto, written by John Rutter.

In 1988, Martin produced an album version of the play Under Milk Wood, with music by Martin, Elton John, and Mark Knopfler; Anthony Hopkins played the part of "First Voice".

In 1979, Martin opened AIR Montserrat, a studio on the Caribbean island of Montserrat. This studio was destroyed by Hurricane Hugo ten years later.

Later work, 1990s–2010
In 1991, Martin contributed the string arrangement and conducted the orchestra for the song "Ticket To Heaven" on the last Dire Straits studio album, On Every Street. In 1992, Martin worked with Pete Townshend on the musical stage production of The Who's Tommy. The play opened on Broadway in 1993, with the original cast album being released that summer. Martin won the Grammy Award for Best Musical Show Album in 1993, as the producer of that album.

In 1995, he contributed the horn and string arrangement for the song "Latitude" on the Elton John Made in England album, which was recorded at Martin's AIR Studios London. He also produced "Candle in the Wind 1997", Elton's tribute single to the late Diana, Princess of Wales, which topped charts around the world in September 1997 and became the best-selling British single of all time. It was also Martin's final production of a single.

On 15 September 1997, Martin arranged a benefit concert for the island of Montserrat, which had been devastated by volcanic activity. The event, Music for Montserrat, featured Paul McCartney, Elton John, Sting, Phil Collins, Eric Clapton, Jimmy Buffett, and Carl Perkins.

Martin served as a consultant to the June 2002 Party at the Palace at Buckingham Palace Garden for the Queen's Golden Jubilee.

In 2010, Martin was the executive producer of the hard rock debut of Arms of the Sun, an all-star project featuring Rex Brown (Pantera, Down), John Luke Hebert (King Diamond), Lance Harvill and Ben Bunker.

Film and composing work
Beginning in the late 1950s, Martin began to supplement his producer income by publishing music and having his artists record it. He used the pseudonyms Lezlo Anales and John Chisholm, before settling on Graham Fisher as his primary pseudonym. His earliest composing work was incidental music to accompany Peter Sellers's comedy records. His film work was aided by his secretary and second wife, Judy, whose father was chairman of the Film Producers Guild. In 1966, he signed a long-term deal with United Artists to write instrumental music.

Martin composed, arranged, and produced film scores beginning in the early 1960s, including the instrumental scores of the films A Hard Day's Night (1964, for which he won an Academy Award Nomination), Ferry Cross the Mersey (1965), Yellow Submarine (1968), and Live and Let Die (1973). Other notable movie scores include Crooks Anonymous (1962), The Family Way (1966), Pulp (1972, starring Michael Caine and Mickey Rooney), the Peter Sellers film The Optimists of Nine Elms (1973), and the John Schlesinger-directed Honky Tonk Freeway (1981).

Martin was also commissioned to write an official opening theme for BBC Radio 1's launch in September 1967. Entitled "Theme One", it was the first music heard on Radio 1 (not The Move's "Flowers in the Rain", which was the first record played in full on the station). The tune was later covered by the British progressive rock group Van der Graaf Generator.

In November 2017, the Craig Leon-produced album George Martin – Film Scores and Original Orchestral Music was released. The album of new recordings collected a selection of Martin's compositions together for the first time, including previously unheard pieces Belle Etoile and sketches from the feature film The Mission (1986) which were not used in the original soundtrack.

Music from the James Bond series
Martin directly and indirectly contributed to the main themes of three films in the James Bond series. Although Martin did not produce the theme for the second Bond film, From Russia with Love, he was responsible for the signing of Matt Monro to EMI, just months prior to his recording of the song of the same title.
Martin also produced two of the best-known James Bond themes. The first was "Goldfinger" by Shirley Bassey in 1964. The second, in 1973, was "Live and Let Die" by Paul McCartney and Wings for the film of the same name. He also composed and produced the film's score.

Books and audio retrospective
In 1979, Martin published a memoir, All You Need is Ears (co-written with Jeremy Hornsby), that described his work with the Beatles and other artists (including Peter Sellers, Sophia Loren, Shirley Bassey, Flanders and Swann, Matt Monro, and Dudley Moore), and gave an informal introduction to the art and science of sound recording. In 1993, he published Summer of Love: The Making of Sgt Pepper (published in the U.S. as With a Little Help from My Friends: The Making of Sgt Pepper, co-authored with William Pearson), which also included interview quotations from a 1992 South Bank Show episode discussing the album. Martin also edited a 1983 book called Making Music: The Guide to Writing, Performing and Recording.

In 2001, Martin released Produced by George Martin: 50 Years in Recording, a six-CD retrospective of his entire studio career, and in 2002, Martin launched Playback, his limited-edition illustrated autobiography, published by Genesis Publications.

Television

The Rhythm of Life
In 1997–98, Martin hosted a three-part BBC co-produced documentary series titled The Rhythm of Life, in which he discussed various aspects of musical composition with professional musicians and singers, among them Brian Wilson, Billy Joel, and Celine Dion. The series aired on the Ovation television network in the United States.

Produced by George Martin
On 25 April 2011, a 90-minute documentary feature film co-produced by the BBC Arena team, Produced by George Martin, aired to critical acclaim for the first time in the UK. It combines rare archive footage and new interviews with, among others, Paul McCartney, Ringo Starr, Jeff Beck, Cilla Black, and Giles Martin, and tells the life story of how Martin, a schoolboy growing up in the Depression, grew up to become a legendary music producer. The film, with over 50 minutes of extra footage, including interviews from Rick Rubin, T-Bone Burnett and Ken Scott, was released worldwide by Eagle Rock Entertainment on DVD and Blu-ray on 10 September 2012. Mark Lewisohn curated an accompanying six-volume musical box set.

Soundbreaking: Stories from the Cutting Edge of Recorded Music
Produced in association with Sir George Martin, Soundbreaking: Stories from the Cutting Edge of Recorded Music charts a century's worth of music innovation and experimentation, and offers a behind-the-scenes look at recorded music. Soundbreaking features more than 160 original interviews with some of the most celebrated recording artists, producers, and music industry pioneers of all time. Soundbreaking became George Martin's last, and one of his most personal, projects when he died six days before its premiere.

Personal life
In 1946, George met Jean ("Sheena") Chisholm, a fellow member of the Royal Navy's choir. They bonded over their mutual love of music. Martin's mother strongly disapproved of Sheena as a partner for George, causing early strain in the relationship. Against Bertha's wishes, Martin and Sheena married at the University of Aberdeen On 3 January 1948. Bertha died three weeks later of a brain hemorrage, and Martin felt responsible for his mother's death. They had two children, Alexis (born 1953) and Gregory Paul Martin (born 1957). Around 1955, the Martins moved from London and bought a home in the development town of Hatfield, Hertfordshire some 20 miles north. By the early 1960s, George sought divorce, but Sheena refused, citing her childcare needs. By this time, Martin had also moved out of Hatfield and rented a small flat in central London, which he shared with his widowed father for a time. Their divorce was finalized in February 1965.

Martin met Judy Lockhart Smith on his first day of work at EMI Studios in 1950, when she served as secretary to Parlophone director Oscar Preuss. Martin chose to retain her as secretary when he assumed direction of Parlophone in 1955, and they commuted together from Hatfield each day. Martin and Lockhart Smith began a discreet affair in the late 1950s. They married on 24 June 1966 at the Marylebone Registry Office. They had two children, Lucie (born 1967) and Giles Martin (born 1969).

George spent his later years with Judy at their home in Coleshill, Oxfordshire.

Death
Martin died in his sleep on the night of 8 March 2016 at his home in Wiltshire, England, at the age of 90. His death was announced by Ringo Starr on his Twitter account, and a spokesperson for Universal Music Group confirmed his death. The cause of his death was not immediately disclosed, though biographer Kenneth Womack subsequently wrote that Martin had battled stomach cancer. His funeral was held on 14 March at All Saints Church in Coleshill, and he was buried nearby. A memorial service was held on 11 May at St Martin-in-the-Fields, attended by Paul McCartney, Ringo Starr, Yoko Ono, Olivia Harrison, Elton John, Bernard Cribbins and former colleagues.

Awards and recognition
 Grammy Award 1967 – Best Contemporary Album (as producer of Sgt. Pepper's Lonely Hearts Club Band)
 Grammy Award 1967 – Album of the Year (as producer of Sgt. Pepper's Lonely Hearts Club Band)
 Grammy Award 1973 – Best Arrangement, Accompanying Vocalist(s) (as arranger of "Live and Let Die")
 BRIT Awards 1977 – Best British Producer (of the past 25 years).
 BRIT Awards 1984 – Outstanding Contribution To Music
 Grammy Award 1993 – Best Musical Show Album (as producer of The Who's Tommy)
 Grammy Award 2007 – Best Compilation Soundtrack Album For Motion Picture, Television Or Other Visual Media, producer together with Giles Martin, of The Beatles album Love
 Grammy Award 2007 – Best Surround Sound Album, producer together with Giles Martin, of The Beatles album Love
 In 1965, he was nominated for an Academy Award 1964 – Scoring of Music (for A Hard Day's Night)
 In April 1989, he was awarded an Honorary Doctorate in Music by Berklee College of Music in Boston, Massachusetts.
 On 9 July 1992, he was awarded an honorary Master of Arts degree by University of Salford, in recognition of his involvement with the innovative BSc Hons Popular Music and Recording validated by the university (taught at University College Salford), and his contribution to British popular music in general.
 He was inducted into the Rock and Roll Hall of Fame on 15 March 1999 and into the UK Music Hall of Fame on 14 November 2006.
 Martin was named the British Phonographic Industry's "Man of the Year" of 1998.
 In 2002, he was given the Lifetime Achievement Award for Services to Film by the World Soundtrack Academy at Belgium's Flanders International Film Festival.
 In 2002, Martin was honoured with a gold medal for Services to the Arts from the CISAC (the International Confederation of Societies of Authors and Composers).
He was granted his own coat of arms in March 2004 by the College of Arms. His shield features three beetles, a house martin holding a recorder, and the Latin motto Amore Solum Opus Est ("All You Need Is Love").
 In November 2006, he was awarded an Honorary Doctorate in Music by Leeds Beckett University.
 In September 2008, he was awarded the James Joyce Award by the Literary and Historical Society of University College Dublin.
 On 25 May 2010, he was given an honorary membership in the Audio Engineering Society at the 128th AES Convention in London.
 On 29 June 2011, he was given an honorary degree, Doctor of Music, from the University of Oxford.
 On 17 October 2012, he won a lifetime award in the 39th BASCA Gold Badge Awards

Martin was one of a handful of producers to have number one records in three or more consecutive decades (1960s, 1970s, 1980s, and 1990s). Others in this group include Phil Spector (1950s, 1960s and 1970s), Quincy Jones (1960s, 1970s and 1980s), Michael Omartian (1970s, 1980s and 1990s), and Jimmy Jam and Terry Lewis (1980s, 1990s, and 2000s).

Selected non-Beatles hit records produced or co-produced by George Martin
During his career, Martin produced 30 number-one singles and 16 number-one albums in the UK – plus a record-tying 23 number-one singles and 19 number-one albums in the US (most of which were by the Beatles).

 
 "You're Driving Me Crazy", The Temperance Seven (25 May 1961, no. 1 UK)
 "My Kind of Girl", Matt Monro (31 July 1961, no. 5 UK)
 "My Boomerang Won't Come Back", Charlie Drake (5 October 1961, no. 14 UK)
 "Sun Arise", Rolf Harris (25 October 1962, no. 3 UK)
 "How Do You Do It?", Gerry & the Pacemakers (11 April 1963, no. 1 UK)
 "Bad to Me", Billy J. Kramer with the Dakotas (22 August 1963, no. 1 UK)
 "Hello Little Girl", The Fourmost (30 August 1963, no. 9 UK)
 "Little Children", Billy J. Kramer with the Dakotas (19 March 1964, no. 1 UK)
 "Don't Let the Sun Catch You Crying", Gerry and the Pacemakers (4 July 1964, no. 4 US)
 "You're My World", Cilla Black (1 August 1964, no. 1 UK)
 "Walk Away", Matt Monro (4 September 1964, no. 4 UK)
 "I Like It", Gerry & the Pacemakers (7 November 1964, no. 1 UK)
 "I'll Be There", Gerry & the Pacemakers (30 January 1965, no. 15 UK)
 "Ferry Cross the Mersey", Gerry & the Pacemakers (20 March 1965, no. 6 US)
 "Goldfinger", Shirley Bassey (27 March 1965, no. 8 UK)
 "Alfie", Cilla Black (10 September 1966, no. 9 UK)
 "Step Inside Love", Cilla Black (8 March 1968, no. 8 UK)
 "Live and Let Die", Paul McCartney & Wings (1 June 1973, no. 9 UK, no. 2 US)
 "Tin Man", America (9 November 1974, no. 4 US)
 "Lonely People", America (8 March 1975, no. 5 US)
 "Sister Golden Hair", America (14 June 1975, no. 1 US)
 "Oh! Darling", Robin Gibb (7 October 1978, no. 15 UK)
 "The Night Owls", Little River Band (1981, no. 6 US)
 "Ebony and Ivory", Paul McCartney & Stevie Wonder (29 March 1982, no. 1 UK and US)
 "Say Say Say", Paul McCartney & Michael Jackson (10 December 1983, no. 2 UK, no. 1 US)
 "No More Lonely Nights", Paul McCartney (8 December 1984, no. 2 UK, no. 6 US)
 "Morning Desire", Kenny Rogers (10 July 1985, no. 1 US Country)
 "The Man I Love", Kate Bush & Larry Adler (18 July 1994, no. 27 UK)
 "Candle in the Wind 1997", Elton John (11 October 1997, no. 1 UK and US)
 Pure, Hayley Westenra (10 July 2003, no. 1 UK classical chart, no. 8 UK album chart)

Discography
 Off the Beatle Track (1964 Parlophone PCS 3057)
 A Hard Day's Night: Instrumental Versions of the Motion Picture Score (19 February 1965, United Artists)
 George Martin Scores Instrumental Versions of the Hits (1965)
 Help! (1965, Columbia TWO 102)
 ..and I Love Her (1966, Columbia TWO 141)
 George Martin Instrumentally Salutes The Beatle Girls (1966)
 The Family Way (1967)
 British Maid (1968, United Artists SULP 1196, released in the US as London by George)
 Yellow Submarine (side one: The Beatles, side two: The George Martin Orchestra, 1969)
 By George! (1970, Sunset SLS 50182, reissue of British Maid)
 Live and Let Die (producer for Paul McCartney's song, and composer of musical score, 1973)
 Beatles to Bond and Bach (1974)
 In My Life (1998)
 Produced by George Martin (2001)
 The Family Way (2003)

Selected discography (as producer)

 Sidney Torch – "Barwick Green" (The Archers theme) (1951)
 Jack Parnell – "The White Suit Samba" (1951)
 Jimmy Shand – "Bluebell Polka" (1952)
 Kenneth McKellar – "Ae Fond Kiss" (1952)
 Tommy Reilly – "Melody on the Move" (1952)
 Adrian Boult / Jean Pougnet / London Philharmonic Orchestra – The Lark Ascending (1952)
 Peter Ustinov – "Mock Mozart" (1952)
 Eve Boswell – "Pickin' a Chicken" (1955)
 Edna Savage – "Arrivederci Darling" (1955)
 Eamonn Andrews – "The Shifting Whispering Sands" (1956)
 Dick James – "Robin Hood" (1956)
 The Ivor and Basil Kirchin Band – "Rock-A-Beatin' Boogie" (1956)
 Johnny Dankworth – "Experiments With Mice" (1956)
 Shirley Abicair – "Smiley" (1956)
 Glen Mason – "Glendora" (1956)
 Mandy Miller – "Nellie the Elephant" (1956)
 The Vipers Skiffle Group – "Don't You Rock Me Daddy-O" (1957)
 Jim Dale – "Be My Girl" (1957)
 Flanders and Swann – At the Drop of a Hat (1957)
 Ian Wallace – "The Hippopotamus Song" (1957)
 Charlie Drake – "Splish Splash" (1958)
 Peter Sellers – The Best of Sellers (1958)
 Humphrey Lyttelton – "Saturday Jump" (1959)
 Bruce Forsyth – "I'm in Charge" (1959)
 Peter Sellers – Songs for Swingin' Sellers (1959)
 Matt Monro – "Portrait of My Love" (1960)
 Peter Sellers and Sophia Loren – "Goodness Gracious Me" (1960)
 Beyond the Fringe (Original Cast Recording) (1961)
 Dudley Moore – "Strictly for the Birds" (1961)
 Bernard Cribbins – "Right Said Fred" (1962); "Hole in the Ground" (1962); "Gossip Calypso" (1962)
 The Alberts – "Morse Code Melody" (1962)
 Michael Bentine – "Football Results" (1962)
 Terry Scott – "My Brother" (1962)
 Christine Campbell – "If This Should Be a Dream" (1963)
 Joan Sims – "Oh Not Again Ken" (1963)
 Shirley Bassey – "I (Who Have Nothing)" (1963)
 David Frost and Millicent Martin – That Was the Week That Was (1963)
 Cambridge Circus (Original Cast Recording) (1963)
 Flanders and Swann – At the Drop of Another Hat (1964)
 Alma Cogan – "It's You" (1964)
 The Scaffold – "2 Day's Monday" (1966)
 Ron Goodwin – Adventure (1966)
 Edwards Hand – Edwards Hand (1969)
 Stan Getz – Marrakesh Express (1969)
 Ringo Starr – Sentimental Journey (1970)
 Seatrain – Seatrain (1970)
 Seatrain – The Marblehead Messenger (1971)
 The King's Singers – "The King's Singers Collection" (1972)
 Paul Winter Consort – Icarus (1972)
 The King's Singers – "A French Collection" (1973)
 The King's Singers – "Deck the Hall" (1973)
 John Williams – The Height Below (1973)
 Stackridge – The Man in the Bowler Hat (1974, released as Pinafore Days in the US and Canada)
 Mahavishnu Orchestra – Apocalypse (1974)
 America – Holiday (1974)
 Tommy Steele – My Life, My Song (1974)
 Jeff Beck – Blow by Blow (1975)
 America – Hearts (1975)
 America – Hideaway (1976)
 American Flyer – American Flyer (1976)
 Jeff Beck – Wired (1976)
 Cleo Laine – Born On a Friday (1976)
 Jimmy Webb – El Mirage (1977)
 America – Harbor (1977)
 Neil Sedaka – A Song (1977)
 Sgt. Pepper's Lonely Hearts Club Band (1978, original soundtrack)
 America – Silent Letter (1979)
 Gary Brooker – No More Fear of Flying (1979)
 Cheap Trick – All Shook Up (1980)
 UFO – No Place to Run (1980)
 Little River Band – Time Exposure (1981)
 Ultravox – Quartet (1982)
 Paul McCartney – Tug of War (1982)
 Paul McCartney – Pipes of Peace (1983)
 Paul McCartney – Give My Regards to Broad Street (1984)
 Kenny Rogers - The Heart of the Matter (1985)
 Peabo Bryson – Quiet Storm (1986)
 Peabo Bryson – Positive (1988)
 Andy Leek – Say Something (1988)
 Yoshiki – Eternal Melody (1993)
 Tommy (Original Cast Recording) (1993)
 Larry Adler – The Glory of Gershwin (1994)
 Celine Dion – "The Reason" (1997)
 George Martin – In My Life (1998)
 The Beatles – Love (2006)

Coat of arms

Sir George was granted a coat of arms in 2004, with the Latin motto "Amore Solum Opus Est" which translates to "All you need is love." The arms are a prime example of canting arms, creating arms with a visual pun, including Martin, a recorder, beetles, and a badge (not shown) of a zebra holding an abbot's crozier, representing both Abbey Road Studios and the Beatles' album, with its iconic cover featuring a zebra crossing.

See also
The Art of Noise (radio show)

Notes

References

External links

 George Martin – Management biography
 
 
 
 George Martin & The Beatles – All Songs & Performers (NYT; 15 March 2016).
 College of Arms. The Arms of Sir George Martin, Kt., C.B.E.
 "Produced by George Martin" DVD review 
 Interview at Hit Channel
 George Martin interview on BBC Radio 4 Desert Island Discs, 6 August 1982

 
1926 births
2016 deaths
A&R people
Alumni of the Guildhall School of Music and Drama
Apple Records artists
The Beatles
Brit Award winners
Commanders of the Order of the British Empire
Composers awarded knighthoods
Conductors (music) awarded knighthoods
Echo Records artists
EMI Records artists
English male composers
English conductors (music)
British male conductors (music)
English keyboardists
English oboists
English organists
British male organists
English harpsichordists
Harmonium players
Male oboists
English pianists
English audio engineers
English music arrangers
English record producers
English Roman Catholics
Fleet Air Arm personnel of World War II
Grammy Award winners
Honorary Members of the Royal Academy of Music
Knights Bachelor
Musicians from London
Parlophone employees
Parlophone artists
People educated at St Ignatius' College, Enfield
Royal Navy officers
Royal Navy officers of World War II
Military personnel from London
British male pianists